Sericomyrmex burchelli is a species of ant in the family Formicidae. Insects belonging to the Sericomyrmex genus are light yellow to deep ferrugineous brown in color and covered with long, flexible hairs, making them appear silky and velvety to the naked eye. In Latin, "sericeus" means "silky".

References

Further reading

 

Myrmicinae